Car 553 is a privately owned railroad passenger car. It operates exclusively on Metra's Union Pacific North Line in Northeastern Illinois, and is the only privately-owned membership-based commuter rail car operating in the United States.

History 
Private commuter car service originally began on the Chicago and North Western Railway in 1929 to serve wealthy commuters in the affluent North Shore suburbs of Chicago. The first private car was C&NW 6700 and was named "The Deerpath".

Car 553 was originally built for the Chicago and North Western Railway in 1949 by the American Car and Foundry Company as car 7901. It was originally used as a lounge and barbershop car on City of Los Angeles, a long distance train service between Chicago and Los Angeles. In 1961, car 7901 was rebuilt for commuter service and renumbered 553. On November 30, 1975, the car was acquired by Commuter Associates Inc. and continued to see service on the C&NW, operated by the commuter rail branch of the Regional Transportation Authority (which was reorganized into Metra in 1984). In the 1990s, the first female members purchased seats on the car. Car 553 still wore the brown and white color scheme of the pre-Metra Regional Transportation Authority's passenger equipment until late 2017 when it was restored to its original C&NW yellow and green colors and lettering.

Metra service 
Prior to 2022, Car 553 operated twice daily on the Union Pacific North Line between Chicago and Kenosha, Wisconsin. The car operated as part of an agreement between club members and the Union Pacific Railroad (which operates Metra trains on the UP North Line). While in the past, membership was exclusive to wealthy "North Shore" families, it has since become open to anyone. The membership price varies on the boarding station, but ranged from $550 to $850 per calendar quarter. The car arrived at Ogilvie Transportation Center around 8:00 am and departed for Kenosha shortly after 5:30 pm.

In 2022, the car was withdrawn from service and stored temporarily at the California Avenue yard. In July 2022, the car was relocated to the Elburn yard where it would be safer from vandalism. The reasons for withdrawing the car from service were not made public, but with drops in Metra ridership, it's believed that club member dues could no longer support the ongoing operating and maintenance expenses for the car.

References

External links 

Car 553
Car 553
Car 553
American Car and Foundry Company
Private railroad cars